Trill OG is the third solo studio album by UGK member Bun B. It is the third album in his Trill series. The album was released under Universal Music Group after Bun B left Warner Music Group's Asylum Records. The album was released August 3, 2010 on Rap-a-Lot Records and Fontana Distribution. On August 4, 2010, The Source magazine gave Trill OG its rare 5 mic rating.

Conception
In 2009, Play, of production duo Play-N-Skillz, told MTV Canada that a single on Bun's upcoming album would feature 2Pac. In January 2010, Bun B told MTV that the album was scheduled for an April 2010 release. Additionally, Bun confirmed a collaboration with "a hip hop legend and a cultural icon" on the same song, but did not elaborate. He later declared the icons to be Tupac Shakur and Pimp C, along with Trey Songz singing the chorus. The song, "Right Now", was released in the summer of 2010. Bun summarized, "Tupac verse is from the 90's Pimp C's from the 2000s and mine from 2010 and it sounds like we just stepped out the booth yesterday."

Reception

Commercial performance 
The album debuted at number four on the US Billboard 200, selling 39,838 copies in its first week.

Critical response

Trill O.G. received mixed reviews from music critics. At Metacritic, which assigns a normalized rating out of 100 to reviews from mainstream critics, the album received an average score of 59, based on 9 reviews, which indicates "mixed or average reviews". However, Trill OG was the first album to receive a 5 Mic rating from The Source Magazine in five years, the last being Lil' Kim's The Naked Truth. HipHopDX said, "In the end, fans are left with a pleasant closing to a respected series, and one of Hip Hop's most respected voices still outshining the vast majority of his peers." XXL added, "The seasoned MC isn't exactly saying goodbye to rap. However, whenever he does decide to hang it up, Trill O.G. will surely go down as a testament to why Bun B is one of the trillest to ever do it."

David Amidon of PopMatters was more critical saying, "Ultimately, Bun ends up feeling like a bit of a guest on his own LP, similar to Rick Ross' Teflon Don effort, and though Trill O.G. is full of quality-sounding music it simply fails to make any argument for its necessity to anyone but the most strident fans of Bun B's monolithic presence." Tom Breihan of Pitchfork Media shared a similar sentiment. "Throughout, (Bun B) works in the same weary and vaguely clumsy cadence, never bringing the ebulliently eloquent verve he brought to his best UGK verses. Instead he merely seems to dutifully plug away every time he touches a mic. It's tough to imagine how a rapper as great as Bun has managed to turn out an album as consistently turgid and leaden as this."

Singles
The album's lead single, "Countin' Money", which features Yo Gotti & Gucci Mane, was released on July 6, 2010. "Trillionaire", which features T-Pain, was released on July 13, 2010 as the second single. The third single, "Just Like That", which features Young Jeezy and Diamond, was also released on July 13, 2010. The fourth single, "Put It Down", which features Drake was released in December 2010 and the music video was released on the internet December 22, 2010 via Bun B's VEVO account.

Track listing
Credits adapted from album liner notes.

Track notes
  signifies an additional producer
 "Chuuch!!!" features a chorus by Tekai Hicks, and additional background vocals by Erin Cortez and Marq Moody.
 "Lights, Camera, Action" features background vocals by Tekai Hicks.

Charts

Weekly charts

Year-end charts

References

2010 albums
Albums produced by Boi-1da
Albums produced by DJ Khalil
Albums produced by DJ Premier
Albums produced by Drumma Boy
Albums produced by J.U.S.T.I.C.E. League
Bun B albums
Sequel albums
Rap-A-Lot Records albums